In mathematics, a bundle map (or bundle morphism) is a morphism in the category of fiber bundles. There are two distinct, but closely related, notions of bundle map, depending on whether the fiber bundles in question have a common base space. There are also several variations on the basic theme, depending on precisely which category of fiber bundles is under consideration. In the first three sections, we will consider general fiber bundles in the category of topological spaces. Then in the fourth section, some other examples will be given.

Bundle maps over a common base
Let  and  be fiber bundles over a space M. Then a bundle map from E to F over M is a continuous map  such that . That is, the diagram

should commute. Equivalently, for any point x in M,  maps the fiber  of E over x to the fiber  of F over x.

General morphisms of fiber bundles
Let πE:E→ M and πF:F→ N be fiber bundles over spaces M and N respectively. Then a continuous map  is called a bundle map from E to F if there is a continuous map f:M→ N such that the diagram

commutes, that is, . For a given f, such a bundle map  is  said to be a bundle map covering f.

Relation between the two notions
It follows immediately from the definitions that a bundle map over M (in the first sense) is the same thing as a bundle map covering the identity map of M.

Conversely, general bundle maps can be reduced to bundle maps over a fixed base space using the notion of a pullback bundle. If πF:F→ N is a fiber bundle over N and f:M→ N is a continuous map, then the pullback of F by f is a fiber bundle f*F over M whose fiber over x is given by (f*F)x = Ff(x). It then follows that a bundle map from E to F covering f is the same thing as a bundle map from E to f*F over M.

Variants and generalizations
There are two kinds of variation of the general notion of a bundle map.

First, one can consider fiber bundles in a different category of spaces. This leads, for example, to the notion of a smooth bundle map between smooth fiber bundles over a smooth manifold.

Second, one can consider fiber bundles with extra structure in their fibers, and restrict attention to bundle maps which preserve this structure. This leads, for example, to the notion of a (vector) bundle homomorphism between vector bundles, in which the fibers are vector spaces, and a bundle map φ is required to be a linear map on each fiber. In this case, such a bundle map φ (covering f) may also be viewed as a section of the vector bundle Hom(E,f*F) over M, whose fiber over x is the vector space Hom(Ex,Ff(x)) (also denoted L(Ex,Ff(x))) of linear maps from 
Ex to Ff(x).

Fiber bundles
Theory of continuous functions